In enzymology, a S-methyl-5-thioribose kinase is an enzyme that catalyzes the chemical reaction

ATP + S-methyl-5-thio-D-ribose  ADP + S-methyl-5-thio-alpha-D-ribose 1-phosphate

Thus, the two substrates of this enzyme are ATP and S-methyl-5-thio-D-ribose, whereas its two products are ADP and S-methyl-5-thio-alpha-D-ribose 1-phosphate.

This enzyme belongs to the family of transferases, specifically those transferring phosphorus-containing groups (phosphotransferases) with an alcohol group as acceptor.  The systematic name of this enzyme class is ATP:S-methylmethyl-5-thio-D-ribose 1-phosphotransferase. Other names in common use include 5-methylthioribose kinase (phosphorylating), methylthioribose kinase, 5-methylthioribose kinase, and ATP:S5-methyl-5-thio-D-ribose 1-phosphotransferase.  This enzyme participates in methionine metabolism.

Structural studies

References

 
 

EC 2.7.1
Enzymes of known structure